Univalent may refer to:

 Univalent function – an injective holomorphic function on an open subset of the complex plane
 Univalent foundations – a type-based approach to foundation of mathematics
 Univalent relation – a binary relation R that satisfies 
 Valence (chemistry)#univalent – 1-valent.